The 4th Connecticut Infantry Regiment was an infantry regiment that served in the Union Army during the American Civil War.

Service
The 4th Connecticut Infantry Regiment was organized at Hartford, Connecticut and mustered in on May 21, 1861.

The regiment was attached to Abercrombie's 6th Brigade, 2nd Division, Department of Pennsylvania, to August 1861. 2nd Brigade, Banks' Division, Army of the Potomac, to December 1861. Defenses of Washington to January 1862.

The 4th Connecticut Infantry ceased to exist when its designation was changed to 1st Connecticut Heavy Artillery on January 2, 1862.

Detailed service
Left Connecticut for Washington, D.C., June 10.  Duty at Chambersburg, Pennsylvania, and at Hagerstown, Maryland, until July 4, 1861, and at Williamsport until August 16. At Frederick, Maryland, until September 5. Moved to Darnestown September 5, then to Fort Richardson. Service in the Defenses of Washington, D.C., and duty there until January 1862.

Commanders
 Colonel Robert O. Tyler

See also

 Connecticut in the American Civil War
 List of Connecticut Civil War units
 1st Connecticut Heavy Artillery
 4th Connecticut Regiment - Revolutionary War unit with this designation

References
 Andrews, Elisha Benjamin. A Private's Reminiscences of the First Year of the War (Providence, RI: Rhode Island Soldiers and Sailors Historical Society), 1886.
 Connecticut Adjutant-General's Office. Catalogue of the 1st, 2d, 3d, 4th, and 5th Regiments, Connecticut Volunteers, 1861 (Hartford, CT:  Press of Case, Lockwood & Co.), 1861.
 Dyer, Frederick H. A Compendium of the War of the Rebellion (Des Moines, IA:  Dyer Pub. Co.), 1908.
 Hartford City Guard. The City Guard Register: Being a Complete Roster of the Hartford City Guard Since Its Organization in 1861 (Hartford, CT:  The Guard), 1880.
Attribution
 

Military units and formations established in 1861
Military units and formations disestablished in 1862
4th Connecticut Infantry Regiment
1861 establishments in Connecticut